Diomede (Ancient Greek: Διομήδη Diomēdē) is the name of four women in Greek mythology:

 Diomede, daughter of Xuthus. She married Deioneus, king of Phocis, and was the mother of Cephalus, Actor, Aenetus, Phylacus and Asterodia.(Interwiki: bn, ja)
 Diomede or Diomedes, a Lapith and daughter of Lapithes and possibly of Orsinome. She married King Amyclas of Sparta and became the mother of King Argalus, King Cynortes, Hyacinthus, Polyboea, Laodamia (or Leanira), Harpalus, Hegesandre and, in other versions, of Daphne.
 Diomede, according to Homer, the daughter of one Phorbas, taken by Achilles as captive from Lesbos. She is named in the Iliad as the captive that Achilles lays with after he turns away the embassy of Ajax and Odysseus.
 Diomede, wife of Pallas and mother of Euryalus, who fought at Troy. Nothing else is known about her.

Notes

References 

 Apollodorus, The Library with an English Translation by Sir James George Frazer, F.B.A., F.R.S. in 2 Volumes, Cambridge, MA, Harvard University Press; London, William Heinemann Ltd. 1921. ISBN 0-674-99135-4. Online version at the Perseus Digital Library. Greek text available from the same website.
Dictys Cretensis, from The Trojan War. The Chronicles of Dictys of Crete and Dares the Phrygian translated by Richard McIlwaine Frazer, Jr. (1931-). Indiana University Press. 1966. Online version at the Topos Text Project.
 Hard, Robin, The Routledge Handbook of Greek Mythology: Based on H.J. Rose's "Handbook of Greek Mythology", Psychology Press, 2004, . Google Books.
Homer, The Iliad with an English Translation by A.T. Murray, Ph.D. in two volumes. Cambridge, MA., Harvard University Press; London, William Heinemann, Ltd. 1924. . Online version at the Perseus Digital Library.
Homer, Homeri Opera in five volumes. Oxford, Oxford University Press. 1920. . Greek text available at the Perseus Digital Library.
 Parthenius, Love Romances translated by Sir Stephen Gaselee (1882-1943), S. Loeb Classical Library Volume 69. Cambridge, MA. Harvard University Press. 1916.  Online version at the Topos Text Project.
 Parthenius, Erotici Scriptores Graeci, Vol. 1. Rudolf Hercher. in aedibus B. G. Teubneri. Leipzig. 1858. Greek text available at the Perseus Digital Library.
 Pausanias, Description of Greece with an English Translation by W.H.S. Jones, Litt.D., and H.A. Ormerod, M.A., in 4 Volumes. Cambridge, MA, Harvard University Press; London, William Heinemann Ltd. 1918. . Online version at the Perseus Digital Library
Pausanias, Graeciae Descriptio. 3 vols. Leipzig, Teubner. 1903.  Greek text available at the Perseus Digital Library.

Princesses in Greek mythology
Queens in Greek mythology
Women of the Trojan war
Lapiths in Greek mythology
Phocian characters in Greek mythology
Laconian mythology